CSI: Vegas is an American crime drama television series that debuted on CBS on October 6, 2021. It is a follow-up to the long-running series CSI: Crime Scene Investigation, and the fifth series in the CSI franchise. The first season stars William Petersen and Jorja Fox as Gil Grissom and Sara Sidle, while the second season stars Marg Helgenberger as Catherine Willows, reprising their roles from CSI: Crime Scene Investigation. Paula Newsome, Matt Lauria, Mel Rodriguez, and Mandeep Dhillon portray new characters. Wallace Langham, Paul Guilfoyle and Eric Szmanda also reprise their roles as David Hodges, Jim Brass and Greg Sanders, in a guest capacity. Originally branded as an epilogue limited series, it was renewed for a second season in December 2021, without Fox, Petersen, or Rodriguez returning. The first season consisted of ten episodes. The second season premiered on September 29, 2022, consisting of 21 episodes. On February 21, 2023, CBS renewed CSI: Vegas for a third season, set to premiere during the 2023–24 television season.

Cast

Main
 Paula Newsome as Maxine "Max" Roby, head of the Las Vegas Crime Lab
 Matt Lauria as Joshua "Josh"  Folsom, a Level III CSI who is typically the lead investigator on cases
 Mandeep Dhillon as Ahalya "Allie" Rajan, a Level II CSI who is an immigrant who followed her dreams to Las Vegas
 Mel Rodriguez as Dr. Hugo Ramirez (season 1), the Chief Medical Examiner
 Jorja Fox as Sara Sidle (season 1)
 William Petersen as Gil Grissom (season 1)
 Ariana Guerra as Serena Chavez (season 2), a homicide detective
 Jay Lee as Christopher "Chris" Park (season 2; recurring season 1), a Level I CSI
 Lex Medlin as Beau Finado (season 2), a Level I CSI
 Marg Helgenberger as Catherine Willows (season 2)

Recurring
 Paul Guilfoyle as Jim Brass (season 1)
 Wallace Langham as David Hodges (season 1)
 Chelsey Crisp as Emma Hodges (season 1), David's wife
 Jamie McShane as Anson Wix (season 1), a corrupt civil attorney
 Sarah Gilman as Penelope "Penny" Gill, a CSI
 Sean James as Will Carson, a homicide detective
 Kat Foster as Nora Cross, an Internal Affairs detective
 Robert Curtis Brown as Undersheriff Cade Wyatt
 Luke Tennie as Bryan Roby, Maxine's Son
 Kathleen Wilhoite as Dr. Diane Auerbach (season 2)
 Sara Amini as Dr. Sonya Nikolayevich, chief medical examiner (season 2)
 Joel Johnstone as Jack Nikolayevich, assistant medical examiner and Sonya's older brother (season 2)
 Sherri Saum as Jodi Wallach, a board member of the Eclipse Casino (season 2)
 Katie Stevens as Lindsey Willows (season 2)
Derek Webster as Dr. Milton Hudson, substitute medical examiner (season 2)
 Rob Morgan as Daniel Jordan, Maxine's ex-husband (season 2)
 Eric Szmanda as Greg Sanders (season 2)

Episodes

Series overview

Season 1 (2021)

Season 2 (2022–2023)

Production

Development
Following the airing of the finale of CSI: Crime Scene Investigation, in 2015, series creator Anthony E. Zuiker said the future of the characters would be that "Grissom and Sara ... [would still be] sailing the oceans, ... saving the environment, ... [would have] children, and they would dedicate their lives to the betterment of humanity. ... Catherine would still be running the crime lab, ... [Brass] probably would retire, ... and DB probably is working in the private sector in Washington DC. And I think that all these characters would still have their toe in the crime water."

Soon after the cancellation of the last series in the franchise, CSI: Cyber, in 2016, it was announced that the producers were open to reviving the franchise. The CBS Entertainment president at the time, Glenn Geller, said, "We are incredibly proud of all CSI shows. It may come back in another incarnation." On February 10, 2020, it was announced that an event series sequel to CSI: Crime Scene Investigation was being discussed, from Jason Tracey, CBS Studios, and Jerry Bruckheimer Television, with Tracey, Jerry Bruckheimer, and Jonathan Littman as executive producers.

On August 10, 2020, it was announced that the series was still in development, now titled CSI: Vegas, with the original star of CSI: Crime Scene Investigation, William Petersen, set to executive produce alongside Tracey, Bruckheimer, Littman, KirstieAnne Reed, Zuiker, Craig O'Neill, and Cynthia Chvatal. In February 2021, the series was nearing a formal straight-to-series order. It was also announced that although it is being billed as an event series, it could become an ongoing series airing multiple seasons.

On March 31, 2021, it was announced that CSI: Vegas had officially been ordered to series, with Uta Briesewitz directing the pilot. On December 15, 2021, CBS renewed the series for a second season. CBS Entertainment president Kelly Kahl confirmed that the second season will be longer than 13 episodes, although the network currently has "not done a final tally yet". In October 2022, Anthony E. Zuiker teased that the second season will consist of at least 17 episodes. It was later revealed that the season would comprise 21 episodes in total. On February 21, 2023, CBS renewed CSI: Vegas for a third season.

Casting
On February 10, 2020, it was announced that two of the original stars of CSI: Crime Scene Investigation, Petersen and Jorja Fox, were in talks to potentially reprise their roles as Gil Grissom and Sara Sidle. On August 10, 2020, it was announced that Petersen and Fox were still in negotiations to return, and that casting was under way for five new characters.

On February 12, 2021, it was revealed that Paula Newsome, Matt Lauria, and Mel Rodriguez had been cast in the series. Lauria and Rodriguez both previously guest-starred as different characters in the franchise. It was also revealed that Petersen and Fox were finalizing their deals. On March 31, 2021, it was announced that Mandeep Dhillon had been cast in the series.

Later that day, it was revealed that Wallace Langham would reprise his role as David Hodges, and Petersen and Fox were officially announced as being cast. On May 3, 2021, it was announced that Jamie McShane had been cast in a recurring role and that Paul Guilfoyle would reprise his role as Jim Brass in two episodes. In September 2021, Zuiker hinted that additional CSI: Crime Scene Investigation characters may make appearances in the series.

On December 15, 2021, it was announced alongside the second season renewal that Petersen won't return as a cast member, though he would remain as executive producer. On January 25, 2022, it was announced that Fox will also not return for the second season. Two days later, it was announced that Rodriguez would leave ahead of the second season as well. On February 11, 2022, it was announced that Marg Helgenberger will reprise her role as Catherine Willows in the second season. On May 24, 2022, it was announced that recurring actor Jay Lee would be upgraded to series regular and that Lex Medlin and Ariana Guerra would join the cast as regulars. On December 15, 2022, it was reported that Eric Szmanda would reprise his role as Greg Sanders in several episodes during the latter half of the second season.

Filming
On August 10, 2020, it was announced that filming was planned to start in the fall of 2020, whenever COVID-19 conditions permitted Hollywood production to resume. On January 8, 2021, it was announced that the series is set to begin production in early 2021. Filming began May 4, 2021, and was scheduled to run until November 4, 2021, in Los Angeles, California. On August 22, 2021, it was reported that Petersen had been taken to a hospital after becoming ill during filming.

Release

Broadcast
The series was originally planned to air on October 6, 2020, to mark 20 years since the day of the premiere of CSI: Crime Scene Investigation. However, on August 10, 2020, it was announced that due to COVID-19 related production shutdowns, the series would not be able to meet that premiere date. On January 8, 2021, it was announced that the series was set to air during the 2021–22 television season. On May 19, 2021, CBS announced that the series would premiere in fall 2021, on Wednesdays at 10 p.m. ET. On July 12, 2021, a premiere date of October 6, 2021, was announced by CBS, to mark 21 years since the day of the premiere of CSI: Crime Scene Investigation. The first season comprises ten episodes.

The first season was premiered on Alibi in July 2022, with the second season premiering in December 2022 in the United Kingdom.
Asia | AXN

Home media
The first season was released on Region 1 DVD and Blu-Ray Region A on April 5, 2022, followed by Region 2 DVD on November 14, 2022.

Reception

Ratings

Season 1

Season 2

References

External links
 
 

 
2020s American crime drama television series
2020s American police procedural television series
2021 American television series debuts
American sequel television series
CBS original programming
CSI (franchise)
CSI: Crime Scene Investigation
Fictional portrayals of the Las Vegas Metropolitan Police Department
Television productions postponed due to the COVID-19 pandemic
Television shows set in the Las Vegas Valley
Television series by CBS Studios